Heal Me is the seventh studio album by New Zealand dub band Salmonella Dub. It was released in 2007.

A limited edition bonus disc was also released, with four remixes: "Gifts (Shiva dub"), "Lightning (Seens from space version)", "Watching it Rain (Frogga blues soaking it in mix)" and "Seeds (South of Critinden").

Track listing
 "Watching It Rain" – 5:28
 "Beat the Game" – 4:40
 "Love Sunshine and Happiness" – 5:19
 "Lightning" – 4:53
 "Heal Me" – 4:25
 "Rong" – 5:12
 "Gifts" – 5:04
 "That Easy" – 4:51
 "Seeds" – 7:56
 "Nothing Is Free" – 5:56
 "Hapuku Rain Outro" – 3:02

Heal Me: Tonic (limited edition bonus disc)
 "Gifts" (Shiva Dub) – 9:05 
 "Lightning" (Seens from Space Version) – 4:25
 "Watching It Rain" (Frogga Blues Soaking in It Mix) – 5:52
 "Seeds (South of Critinden)" — 8:29

Personnel
 Dave Deakins
 Andrew Penman
 Mark Tyler
 Peter Wood
 David Harrow – percussion, theremin, Juno 106, Wurlitzer Rhodes, vocals)
 Conan Wilcox – tenor saxophone on "Love Sunshine and Happiness" and "Gifts")

Charts

References

2007 albums
Salmonella Dub albums